This is a list of the Los Angeles Clippers' (formerly Buffalo Braves and San Diego Clippers) National Basketball Association (NBA) draft selections in their -year history.

Key

Selections

Notes

References
 
 

 
National Basketball Association draft
draft history